Upper Red Hook is a hamlet and census-designated place (CDP) in the town of Red Hook in Dutchess County, New York, United States. It was first listed as a CDP prior to the 2020 census.

The community is in northwestern Dutchess County, in the northeastern part of the town of Red Hook. U.S. Route 9 passes through the CDP, leading north  to Hudson and southwest through Red Hook village  to Rhinebeck.

Demographics

References 

Census-designated places in Dutchess County, New York
Census-designated places in New York (state)